You're Lucky to Have Friends Like Us is the debut studio album of Shit and Shine, released on 1 April 2004 by Riot Season. It was released on CD for the first time when it was coupled with the band's third album, Jealous of Shit and Shine.

Track listing

Personnel
Adapted from the You're Lucky to Have Friends Like Us liner notes.
Shit and Shine
 Craig Clouse – electric guitar, bass guitar, vocals, lawn mower
 Larry Mannigan – drums
 Frank Mckayhan – bass guitar, electric guitar, vocals, lawn mower

Release history

References

External links 
 
 You're Lucky to Have Friends Like Us at Bandcamp

2004 debut albums
Shit and Shine albums